Branded a Bandit is a 1924 American silent Western film directed by Paul Hurst and starring Yakima Canutt, Judge Hamilton and Wilbur McGaugh.

Cast
 Yakima Canutt as Jess Dean
 Judge Hamilton as Granddaddy Jim Turner
 Wilbur McGaugh as 'Horse' Williams
 Alys Murrell as Jennie Turner

References

Bibliography
 Langman, Larry. A Guide to Silent Westerns. Greenwood Publishing Group, 1992.
 Munden, Kenneth White. The American Film Institute Catalog of Motion Pictures Produced in the United States, Part 1. University of California Press, 1997.

External links
 

1924 films
1924 Western (genre) films
Films directed by Paul Hurst
Arrow Film Corporation films
Silent American Western (genre) films
1920s English-language films
1920s American films